Major General Robert Edward Lee Michie (June 1, 1864 – June 4, 1918) was a U.S. Army general.

Early life
Michie was born in Bellair, Virginia, in Albemarle County on June 1, 1864 to Dr. J. Augustus Michie and Susan Jackson Michie. He graduated number twenty-six of thirty-nine from the United States Military Academy at West Point, New York, in 1885. Among his classmates included several officers who would become future general officers, such as Beaumont B. Buck, Joseph E. Kuhn, Henry P. McCain, Robert Lee Bullard, George W. Burr, John D. Barrette, John M. Carson Jr., Robert A. Brown, Charles H. Muir, William F. Martin, Daniel B. Devore and Willard A. Holbrook.

Military career
During the Spanish–American War, Michie served as a major, U.S. Volunteers, from 1898 to 1899. He also served in the Adjutant General's Department in Havana and in Pinar del Rio, Cuba. From 1900 to 1901, he was the adjutant general, Department of the Missouri (River) and from 1903 to 1904 he was in the Philippines. He served with the General Staff from 1904 to 1917. Michie returned to Washington for duty with the General Staff, and also was sent as an observer of the German Army Maneuvers of 1908. His travels continued in 1917, when he went with a special United States commission to Russia. Michie was promoted to brigadier general (NA) on August 5, 1917, and was assigned to command the 53rd Infantry Brigade, 27th Division, at Camp Wadsworth, South Carolina, near Spartanburg. He took it to France with the American Expeditionary Forces in 1918; he died there at age 54 on June 4, 1918.

Personal life
Michie married Gray Beachy on January 19, 1887.

References

1864 births
1918 deaths
United States Army generals
People from Albemarle County, Virginia
19th-century American military personnel
20th-century American military personnel
United States Military Academy alumni
United States Army generals of World War I
American military personnel of the Spanish–American War
Military personnel from Virginia